Alisha Singh  is an Indian television actress, dancer and choreographer. She was the winner of the reality show Boogie Woogie four times and a runner up in Dance India Dance. She is also known for television shows Dil Dosti Dance and Jhalak Dikhhla Jaa. She also assisted the choreography of several dance songs in films like Dhoom 3, Bajrangi Bhaijaan and Kung Fu Yoga.

Filmography 
Television

References

External links

Living people
21st-century Indian actresses
Actresses from Bihar
Indian film actresses
Indian female dancers
Dancers from Bihar
21st-century Indian dancers
Indian choreographers
Indian women choreographers
1991 births